Robin Montgomerie-Charrington (born Robert Victor Campbell Montgomerie; 23 June 1915, in Mayfair, London – 3 April 2007) was a British racing driver from England. He took up 500cc Formula 3 in 1950, achieving modest results through '50 and '51.  He participated in one Formula One World Championship Grand Prix, the European Grand Prix at Spa, Belgium, on 22 June 1952. He retired his Aston Butterworth with "engine trouble" after 17 laps and scored no World Championship points.

He later emigrated to the United States.

Complete Formula One World Championship results
(key)

See also
Bill Aston

References

External links 
 Robin Montgomerie-Charrington profile at The 500 Owners Association

English racing drivers
English Formula One drivers
1915 births
2007 deaths